Pukkoya family of Panakkad is a Yemeni-origin sayyid (thangal) family based in present-day northern Kerala. The family, claiming descent from the family of Prophet Muhammad, is generally revered by the Sunni Shāfiʿī Kerala Muslims. The thangals remain highly respected as religious and political leaders amongst the Muslims of Kerala.

The Panakkad family descended from Sayyid Ali who emigrated from the Ḥaḍramawt region of Yemen to Kerala in the 18th century. By the 19th century, the ethnic Yemenis came to occupy a powerful position within the north Kerala Muslim community. They were eventually recognized as the theological, juridical, and political community leaders of Kerala Muslims.

Kodappanakal House is the ancestral house of the family. Sayyid Sadiq Ali Shihab Thangal (born 1964) is the current eldest Panakkad Thangal.

Prominent members 

 Sayyid Ali (18th century)
 Sayyid Hussain ibn Muhlar (1812–1882)
 P. M. S. A. Pukkoya Thangal (died 1975)
 Sayyid Muhammedali Shihab Thangal (1936–2009)
 Sayyid Hyderali Shihab Thangal (1947–2022)
 Sayyid Sadiq Ali Shihab Thangal (born 1964)

References

External links 
 Munavvar Ali Shihab Thangal (official twitter handle) 

Islam in Kerala
Descendants of individuals